Penrhyn is a  in the  community of Llanfair-yn-Neubwll, Ynys Môn, Wales, which is 135.6 miles (218.1 km) from Cardiff and 221.5 miles (356.4 km) from London.

References

See also
List of localities in Wales by population

Villages in Anglesey